Modimelanotide (INN) (code names AP-214, ABT-719, ZP-1480) is a melanocortinergic peptide drug derived from α-melanocyte-stimulating hormone (α-MSH) which was under development by, at different times, Action Pharma, Abbott Laboratories, AbbVie, and Zealand for the treatment of acute kidney injury. It acts as a non-selective melanocortin receptor agonist, with IC50 values of 2.9 nM, 1.9 nM, 3.7 nM, and 110 nM at the MC1, MC3, MC4, and MC5 receptors. Modimelanotide failed clinical trials for acute kidney injury despite showing efficacy in animal models, and development was not further pursued.

See also 
 Afamelanotide
 BMS-470,539
 Bremelanotide
 Melanotan II
 PF-00446687
 Setmelanotide

References

External links 
 Modimelanotide - AdisInsight
 ZP1480 (ABT-719) Publications - Zealand Pharma

Melanocortin receptor agonists
Peptides
Abandoned drugs